Saint-Prosper is a municipality in Les Etchemins Regional County Municipality in Quebec, Canada. It is part of the Chaudière-Appalaches region and the population is 3,596 as of 2021. It is named after Reverend Prosper-Marcel Meunier, first priest of the parish.  It is sometimes known as Saint-Prosper-de-Dorchester.

People linked to Saint-Prosper
 Fabien Roy, Canadian politician

References

Commission de toponymie du Québec
Ministère des Affaires municipales, des Régions et de l'Occupation du territoire

Municipalities in Quebec
Incorporated places in Chaudière-Appalaches